Dominique Diroux (16 February 1978 – 28 September 1998) was a Dutch footballer who played for NAC Breda.

During a match with the NAC reserves on 28 September 1998, Diroux had to be substituted out of the game due to shortness of breath. On the sidelines, he suffered a cardiac arrest and died that same evening.

References

External links
 

1978 births
1998 deaths
Dutch footballers
Association football forwards
NAC Breda players
Eredivisie players
People from Neuwied
Association football players who died while playing
Sport deaths in the Netherlands